HD 106906 b is a directly imaged planetary-mass companion and candidate exoplanet orbiting the star , in the constellation Crux at about  from Earth. It is estimated to be about eleven times the mass of Jupiter and is located about 738 AU away from its host star.  is rare in astronomy; while its mass estimate is nominally consistent with identifying it as an exoplanet, it appears at a much wider separation from its parent star than thought possible for in-situ formation from a protoplanetary disk.

Description
The system is a likely member of the Scorpius–Centaurus association. The high surface temperature, a relic of its recent formation, gives it a luminosity of about 0.02% of the Sun's.

The measurements obtained thus far are not adequate to evaluate its orbital properties. If its eccentricity is large enough, it might approach the outer edge of the primary's debris disk closely enough to interact with it at periastron. In such a case, the outer extent of the debris disk would be truncated at the inner edge of  Hill sphere at periastron.

The odds of such a coincidence were found to be less than 0.01%.

Discovery
Observation of star  began in 2005, utilizing the Magellan Telescopes at the Las Campanas Observatory in the Atacama Desert of Chile, some eight years before the companion was discovered.

Possible formation mechanism
The discovery team and astronomers worldwide were puzzled by  extreme separation from its host star, because it is not considered possible that a star's protoplanetary disk could be extensive enough to permit formation of gas giants at such a distance. To account for the separation, it is theorized that the companion formed independently from its star as part of a binary system. This proposal is somewhat problematic in that the mass ratio of ~140:1 is not in the range expected from this process; binary stars typically do not exceed a ratio of 10:1. This is still considered preferable, however, to the alternate theory that the companion formed closer to its primary and then was scattered to its present distance by gravitational interaction with another orbital object. Additionally, the scattering process would have likely disrupted the protoplanetary disk.

Subsequently, astronomer Paul Kalas and colleagues discovered that Hubble Space Telescope images show a highly asymmetric shape to the debris disk beyond a radius of 200 AU, supporting the hypothesis of a dynamical upheaval that involved the planet and another perturber, such as a second planet in the system or a close encounter with a passing star. One theory modeled the planet as originating in a disk close to the central binary, migrating inward to an unstable resonance with the binary, and then evolving rapidly to a highly eccentric orbit. The planet would be ejected unless its periastron distance was increased away from the binary, such as by a gravitational encounter with a passing star during apastron.

Public reaction
A petition had been launched asking the International Astronomical Union (IAU) to name the companion Gallifrey, after the homeworld of The Doctor on the British science fiction series Doctor Who. The petition gathered over 139,000 signatures. In January 2014, however, it was agreed by the IAU not to accept the petition's goal to name it Gallifrey, as the petition did not follow the public policy of the IAU that a discussion between the public and IAU should be started before naming any spatial entity, and that this policy was not respected.

In 2009, IAU stated that it had no plans to assign names to extrasolar planets, considering it impractical. However, in August 2013 the IAU changed its stance, inviting members of the public to suggest names for exoplanets.

Recent observations made by the Hubble Space Telescope "pinned" down that the planet had a somewhat unusual orbit that perturbed it from its host star's debris disk. With NASA and several news outlets comparing it to the so-called hypothetical Planet Nine.

See also
 DT Virginis, a planetary mass object which orbits a binary star, it has the farthest known orbit of a known  circumbinary object 
 GU Piscium b, an exoplanet orbiting GU Piscium at a distance of 2000 AU and period of 80,000 years in the AB Doradus moving group
 WD 0806-661, a planetary mass object with the widest discovered orbit

Notes

References

Crux (constellation)
Exoplanets detected by direct imaging
Exoplanets discovered in 2013
Lower Centaurus Crux
Giant planets
Circumbinary planets